The Very Best of The Blues Brothers is a 1995 greatest hits album by The Blues Brothers. It is one of several compilations of the band's recordings, following Best of The Blues Brothers (1981) and Dancin' wid da Blues Brothers (1983).

Track listing
 "Everybody Needs Somebody to Love" 1980
 "Gimme Some Lovin'" 1980
 "Think" (with Aretha Franklin) 1980
 "Soul Man" 1978
 "Soul Finger/Funky Broadway" 1980
 "She Caught the Katy" 1980
 "Theme from Rawhide" 1980
 "Sweet Home Chicago" 1980
 "Shake a Tail Feather" (with Ray Charles) 1980
 "Hey Bartender" 1978
 "Messin' with the Kid" 1978
 "Opening: I Can't Turn You Loose" 1978
 "(I Got Everything I Need) Almost" 1978
 "The Old Landmark" (with James Brown) 1980
 "Minnie the Moocher" (with Cab Calloway) 1980
 "Green Onions" 1980
 "Guilty" 1980
 "Riot in Cell Block Number 9" 1980
 "Shot Gun Blues" 1978
 ""B" Movie Box Car Blues" 1978
 "Peter Gunn Theme" 1980
 "Closing: I Can't Turn You Loose" 1978

Personnel
Dan Aykroyd (as Elwood Blues) – vocals, harmonica
John Belushi (as "Joliet" Jake Blues) – vocals
Steve "The Colonel" Cropper – guitar
Donald "Duck" Dunn – bass guitar
Murphy "Murph" Dunne – keyboards, electric piano, Wurlitzer
Steve "Getdwa" Jordan – drums, backing vocals
Tom "Bones" Malone – tenor and baritone saxophone, trombone, trumpet, horn arrangements
Lou "Blue Lou" Marini – tenor and alto saxophone
Matt "Guitar" Murphy – lead guitar
Alan "Mr. Fabulous" Rubin – trumpet, backing vocals
Tom "Triple Scale" Scott – tenor and alto saxophone, horn arrangements
Paul "The Shiv" Shaffer – keyboards, piano, Hammond organ, Wurlitzer, backing vocals, musical director
Willie Hall – drums

Certifications

References
               

The Blues Brothers albums
1995 greatest hits albums
Atlantic Records compilation albums